Bethan is a Welsh feminine given name, and may refer to people :
 Bethan Elfyn (21st century), Welsh radio and television presenter
 Bethan Gwanas (born 1962), Welsh author
 Bethan Huws (born 1961), Welsh artist
 Bethan Jenkins (born 1981), Welsh politician
 Bethan Leadley, also known as Leadley (born 1995), English singer-songwriter, YouTuber, and presenter
 Bethan Wright (born 1996), English actress and model

See also
 Bethany (given name)
 Beth (given name)
Bethan, Nepal

Welsh feminine given names